The fifth season of You Can Dance - Po prostu Tańcz. The dancers compete to win PLN 100,000 and a 3-month scholarship in dance school Broadway Dance Center, but first they have to go through auditions. Later, 36 contestants do the workshops abroad - this season in Tel Aviv, Israel. This seasons on choreography camp special guest choreographer was Travis Payne. From fourteen people, two dancers are eliminated in each episode, to the final episode that features the top two contestants. The show is hosted by Kinga Rusin. The judges are Agustin Egurolla, Michał Piróg and Anna Mucha. It premiered on 3 March 2010.

Auditions
Season Background Song: Empire State of Mind - Jay-Z ft. Alicia Keys
Open auditions for this season were held in the following locations:
 Wrocław
 Poznań
 Gdańsk
 Kraków
 Warszawa

The song during Sneak Peeks at the end of the episode is Just Lose It - Eminem

Top 36 dancers
During the auditions judges picked 36 dancers. These dancers were taking part in choreography camp in Israel.

These dancers were shown only in youcandance.tvn.pl website extras or in special internet series You Can Dance Extra on Onet Vod.
These dancers earned the tickets after choreography round.

Returning Dancers
This season there were some returning dancers, who were trying their chances last seasons.

Choreography Camp (Tel Aviv) week 
Judges: Agustin Egurolla, Anna Mucha, Michał Piróg

Top 14 Contestants

Women

Men

Elimination chart

Note: According to the You Can Dance - Po Prostu Tańcz website Sebastian Piotrowicz was forced to leave the competition due to an injury. He was replaced by Adam Kościelniak, as the last male dancer eliminated, was brought back into the competition. According to rules Sebastian Piotrowicz will be allowed to come straight through top 14 dancers next season.

Performance nights

Week 1: Top 14 Showcase (7 April 2010)

Group Dance: Bohemian Rhapsody — Queen (Hip-Hop/Jazz; Choreographer: Anthony Kaye)
Top 14 Couple dances:

This episode there were no eliminations, but Judges have picked the best and the worst performance of the week. The public voted and picked the best performance of the week
According to Judges:
The Best Couple Performance: Anna Andrzejewska & Jakub Jóżwiak
The Worst Couple Performance: Leal Zielińska & Bartosz Woszczyński
Results of Voting
The Best Couple Performance: Paulina Figińska & Aleksander Paliński

Week 2: Top 14 (21 April 2010)

Group Dance: Sweet Dreams - Beyoncé  (Hip-Hop; Choreographer: Aziz Baki)
Top 14 Couple dances:

Bottom 3 Couples solos:

Eliminated:
Ewa Bielak
Adam Kościelniak

Week 3: Top 12 (28 April 2010)

Group Dance: Sonata no. 2 in B flat minor Op. 35 - Fryderyk Chopin  (Hip-Hop; Choreographer: Steve Bolton)
Top 12 Couple dances:

Bottom 3 Couples solos:

Eliminated:
Katarzyna Mieczkowska
Bartosz Woszczyński

Week 4: Top 10 (5 May 2010)

Group Dance: Creator - Santigold  (Hip-Hop; Choreographer: Gigi Torres)
Top 10 Couple dances:

Bottom 3 Couples solos:

Eliminated:
Adam Kościelniak
Katarzyna Bień

Week 5: Top 8 (12 May 2010)

Group Dances:

Top 8 Couple dances:

Bottom 3 Couples solos:

Eliminated:
Leal Zielińska
Jakub Piotowicz

Week 6: Top 6 (19 May 2010)

Guest Dancers:
"Fresco Dance Company" - Running Two remix - Operation Phoenix
Group Dances:

Top 6 Couple dances:

Top 6's solos:

Eliminated:
Anna Andrzejewska
Aleksander Paliński

Week 7: Semi-Finale - Top 4 (26 May 2010)

Guest Dancers:
Rafał "Tito" Kryla (season 1) with children from his dance school - Don't Bring Me Down, Let's Get Re-Started, Simple Little Melody - The Black Eyed Peas, I See You - Leona Lewis, Rockin To The Beat - The Black Eyed Peas
Group Dance: (I Like) Funky Music - Prince & New Power Generation (Funk;Choreographer: Daniel Celebe)
Top 4 Couple dances:

Top 6's solos:

Eliminated:
Ilona Bekier
Tomasz Barański

Week 8: Finale - Top 2 (3 June 2010)

Group dances:

Guest Dancers:
Anna Kapera season 4 winner performed in opening with Top 14
Jacek Januszko - He performed his own style called "Disco Travolta". He was the first ever contestant in SYTYCD PL which got ticket to Top 36 - You Should Be Dancing - Bee Gees
Top 2 Couple dances:

Top 2 solos:

Results:
Winner: Jakub Jóźwiak
Runner Up: Paulina Figińska

Special Episode

Po Prostu Bitwa! (Just Battle!) (5 June 2010)

This episode was live from Białystok. There were two teams - Male and Female. Male team leader was Michał Piróg and Female team Anna Mucha. From 7 to 12 April on You Can Dance - Po Prostu Tańcz website was uploaded short movies. Later on 12 May 2010 Judges Picked 72 Dancers.  Then on 15 May Judges Picked 48 Dancers. Then short films was uploaded and internauts voted. They picked 24 dancers (12 Male and 12 Female). 29.05 - 4.06 on these days were rehearsals to performance.
On this episode this season top 14 performed twice.
There was also Dancemob. It was danced by every person on audience. The movie with Pop choreography was published on official YCD website around month before event

Judges: Katarzyna Skrzynecka, Piotr Gąsowski, Joanna Chitruszko
Dancemob: Hit The Floor - Afromental - Pop
You Can Dance Top 14's Group Dances:

Musical Guests:
Afromental - Radio Song
Agnieszka Chylińska - Nie Mogę Cię Zapomnieć
Afromental - The Bomb
Female group:
Ida Nowakowska (season 1)
Justyna Białowąs (season 2)
Izabela Orzełowska (season 3)
Paulina Jaksim (season 3)
Adrianna Kawecka (season 3)
Adrianna Piechówka (season 4)
Aleksandra Chaberska (Biała Podlaska)
Agnieszka Miś (Dąbrowa Górnicza)
Magdalena Tyburska (Płock)
Ewelina Tomaszewicz (Suwałki)
Patrycja Kozłowska (Białystok)
Dominika Semeniuk (Piła)
Maja Krajewska (Bydgoszcz)
Luiza Smagowska (Radom)
Joanna Kolk (Działdowo)
Nicol Kupper (Kościerzyna)
Sylwia Murdzek (Pińczów)
Joanna Sokół (Skwierzyna)
Male group:
Jakub Mędzrzycki (season 3)
Michał Pawłowski(season 3)
Tomasz Prządka (season 3)
Marcin Mrożiński (season 3)
Jakub Werel (season 4)
Damian Lipiński (Pabianice)
Mateusz Adamczyk (Leszno)
Jakub Kolasa (Ostrowiec Świętokrzyski)
Łukasz Kosicki (Bydgoszcz)
Maciej Kosicki (Bydgoszcz)
Mieszko Nagaj (Sanok)
Rafał Roczniak (Tuchów)
Kamil Rybiński (Radom)
Mateusz Włoch (Białe Błota)
Rafał Szłyk (Wodzisław Śląski)
Kajetan Luteracki (Łódź)
Jakub Kornalski (Konin)

Round 1 - Contemporary
Group dances:

Round 2 - Hip-Hop
Group dances:

Round 3 - Battle
Male and Female groups - Smash Sumthin - Redman
The Battle was won after voting by Male group. They gained 57% of votes

First for any So You Think You Can Dance series
On Semi-Finale episode there was first ever Electric Boogaloo routine, it was performed by Jakub Jóżwiak & Tomasz Barański.

Rating Figures

External links
So You Think You Can Dance Poland Official Website

Season 05